Les Reed may refer to:

 Les Reed (songwriter) (1935–2019), English songwriter, arranger, musician and light orchestra leader
 Les Reed (footballer) (born 1932), Australian rules footballer
 Les Reed (football manager) (born 1952), English football coach and manager